Qiandongnan Miao and Dong Autonomous Prefecture (), also known as Southeast Qian Autonomous Prefecture of Miao and Dong and shortened as S.E. Qian Prefecture, is an autonomous prefecture in the southeast of Guizhou province in the People's Republic of China, bordering Hunan to the east and Guangxi to the south. The seat of the prefecture is Kaili.

The whole state governs 1 city of Kaili and 15 counties. There are 7 streets, 94 towns, and 110 townships (including 17 ethnic townships). There are 33 ethnic groups living in the territory, including Miao, Dong, Han, Buyi, Shui, Yao, Zhuang, and Tujia. According to the seventh census data in China, as of 00:00 on November 1, 2020, the resident population of Qiandongnan Miao and Dong Autonomous Prefecture was 3,758,622.

Demographics
As of 2018, Qiandongnan had a huji population of 4,811,900, with 3,538,300 (73.53%) of whom were living in the region. 81.3% of the huji population were ethnic minorities: 43.2% were Miao and 30.4% were Dong.

According to the 2010 census, Qiandongnan has 3,480,626 inhabitants. Among them, 1,821,262 (52.33%) were male and 1,659,364 (47.67%) were female. 865,119 (24.86%) were aged 0–14, 2,271,506 (65.26%) were aged 15–64 and 344,002 (9.88%) were aged 65 or above. The urban population was 905,659 (26.02%) while the rural population was 2,574,967 (73.98%).

Subdivisions

The prefecture is subdivided into 16 county-level divisions: 1 county-level city and 15 counties.
County level city: Kaili City
Counties: 
Shibing County
Congjiang County
Jinping County
Zhenyuan County
Majiang County
Taijiang County
Tianzhu County
Huangping County
Rongjiang County
Jianhe County
Sansui County
Leishan County
Liping County
Cengong County
Danzhai County

References

External links
Citadel of the Dong Magazine article on the Dong minority village of Zengchong.
National Geographic article about the Dong of Dimen, Liping County, by Amy Tan (2008)
NPR story about Dong folk songs, featuring Amy Tan, April 2008

 
Autonomous prefectures of the People's Republic of China
Miao people
Kam autonomous areas
Prefecture-level divisions of Guizhou
Miao autonomous prefectures